The Spanish city of Córdoba has the remains of a Roman temple, which was discovered in the 1950s during the expansion of City Hall. It is located in the angle formed by the streets Claudio Marcelo and Capitulares. It was not the only temple that the city had, but it was possibly the most important of all, and the only known by archaeological excavation. It is a Pseudoperipterus, hexastyle and of Corinthian order temple of 32 meters long and 16 wide.

Its construction began during the reign of Emperor Claudius (41-54 AD) and ended some forty years later, during the reign of Emperor Domitian (81-96 CE). Presumably it was dedicated to the imperial cult. The temple underwent some changes in the 2nd century, reforms that coincide with the relocation of the colonial forum.

In the area had already been found architectural elements, such as drums of columns, capitals, etc. all in marble, so the area was known as los marmolejos. This area of Córdoba could become between the 1st century and the 2nd century, as the provincial forum of the Colonia Patricia, title that received the city during the Roman rule.

Current situation 
The building was situated on a podium and consisted of six columns on its front facade and ten columns on each side. Currently, the only remains left of the building are its foundation, the stairs, the altar and some shafts of columns and capitals.

The highlight of the set are the foundations: those that support the building itself and the front counters, arranged in a fan shape and supported on a wall (part of which is visible today at City Hall), which created a stand to prevent it being displaced by the weight of the set, built entirely of marble. This type of fastening, called anterides, was rare in the Empire, which adds value to Cordobese set. The anterideses next to the massive foundations of the temple tell us about the magnitude that the temple could have had, widely visible from the Via Augusta, the main entryway to the east, running parallel to the circus.

Some original fragments of the temple, such as parts of drums or capitals, can be seen. Other remains were taken to the Archaeological and Ethnological Museum of Córdoba for better preservation, as some relief that there are exposed, and which also includes some of its capitals, while several shafts of columns can be seen in the Plaza de las Doblas.

Historical overview 
The temple was built during the second half of the 1st century. The set was begun during the reign of Emperor Claudius (41-54) but was not finished until the reign of Domitian (81-96), at which time it was provided with water. It underwent some modifications in the 2nd century, reforms that seem to coincide with the relocation of the provincial forum to the current environment of the Convento de Santa Ana. The materials used in its construction were varied.

The material used was almost exclusively marble, from columns to the walls, going through the roof and entablature. The quality of marble and the size of that tell us that its construction was carried out by skilled craftsmen of high quality, placing the result at the level of the most beautiful buildings of the empire.

The temple stood at the edge of Colonia Patricia, at the edge of the western walls. A small stretch of the wall was destroyed to build the temple. The land was cleared and leveled, creating a square artificial terrace at the center of which stood the temple.

The square was closed on three of its sides, north, east and south (as indicated by the remains found under the building at the corner of Calle Claudio Marcelo with Calle Diario Córdoba), while the west was open to visually connect with the circus.

Some studies suggest that there was an intermediate terrace that interconnected the two spaces.

If still in use by the 4th-century, the temple would have been closed during the persecution of pagans under the Christian emperors.

See also 
 List of Ancient Roman temples
 List of Roman sites in Spain
 Baetica

References

External links 

 Tab of the set in the Simulacra Romae website, with recreations and mapping of the set

 Cordoba
Buildings and structures in Córdoba, Spain
Historic centre of Córdoba, Spain
Bien de Interés Cultural landmarks in the Province of Córdoba (Spain)
Buildings and structures completed in the 1st century